Bagati Kani Pora or B.K. Pora is a village and municipality in Budgam district of the Indian union territory of Jammu and Kashmir.

Demographics
According to the 2011 census of India, Wavoora has 694 households. The literacy rate of B.K. Pora village was 77.30% compared to 67.16% of Jammu and Kashmir. In Wavoora, Male literacy stands at 84.89% while the female literacy rate was 69.76%.

Transport

Road
Bagati Kani Pora is connected by road with other places in Jammu and Kashmir and India by the NH 1.
Also this road was the oldest route for Srinagar Airport.

Rail

Airports

See also
Jammu and Kashmir
Srinagar
Dooniwari
Budgam

References

Villages in Budgam district